Rudolph is an unincorporated community in Brown County, in the U.S. state of South Dakota.

History
Rudolph was laid out in 1881. It was named for H. Rudolph McCullough, a railroad official. A post office called Rudolph was established in 1883, and remained in operation until it was discontinued in 1908.

References

Unincorporated communities in Brown County, South Dakota
Unincorporated communities in South Dakota